Sázava is a municipality and village in Žďár nad Sázavou District in the Vysočina Region of the Czech Republic. It has about 700 inhabitants.

Administrative parts
The village of Česká Mez is an administrative part of Sázava.

History
The first written mention of Sázava is from 1406.

References

Villages in Žďár nad Sázavou District